Concordia is an unincorporated community in Nueces County, Texas, located along Farm to Market Road 3354 about  east of U.S. Highway 77.

References

Unincorporated communities in Nueces County, Texas
Unincorporated communities in Texas